Pseuderesia vidua is a butterfly in the family Lycaenidae. It is found in western Kenya, Uganda, the Democratic Republic of the Congo (Lualaba) and north-western Tanzania. The habitat consists of forests.

The larvae feed on lichens growing on tree trunks.

References

Butterflies described in 1937
Poritiinae